Obiettivo ragazze is a 1963 Italian comedy film directed by Mario Mattoli and starring the comic duo Franco and Ciccio.

Plot
Four ex-soldiers meet and reminisce about the times they were in the military: a parachutist mistaking his sergeant's home for a brothel, a hypnotized sailor that believes he changed his sex, and two soldiers captured by an African tribe.

Cast
 Franco Franchi
 Ciccio Ingrassia as Franco
 Alighiero Noschese
 Walter Chiari as Alberto
 Vittorio Congia
 Diletta D'Andrea
 Renzo Palmer
 Elio Pandolfi as Aurelio
 Antonella Steni
 Carlo Campanini as Roberto
 Marisa Del Frate as Gina
 Tony Renis as himself

References

External links

1963 films
1963 comedy films
Italian comedy films
1960s Italian-language films
Films directed by Mario Mattoli
Films scored by Gianni Ferrio
1960s Italian films